The 2013 Boys' Youth European Volleyball Championship. Qualification was played in the Czech Republic, Latvia, Slovakia, Turkey and Hungary from January 3 to 7, 2013. The final round (group round and play-off) was contested between April 12 and 21, 2013. The top six teams qualified for the 2013 Youth World Championship.

Participating teams
 Host
 
 
 Qualified through 2013 Boys' Youth European Volleyball Championship Qualification

Pool composition

Squads

Preliminary round
All times are Daylight Saving Time (UTC+02:00)

Pool I
Venue:  Laktaši Sports Hall, Laktaši, Bosnia and Herzegovina

Pool II
Venue:  SC Šumice, Belgrade, Serbia

Final round
All times are Daylight Saving Time (UTC+02:00)
Venue:  Laktaši Sports Hall, Laktaši, Bosnia and Herzegovina

5th to 8th place

5th–8th place playoff

7th place

5th place

Final round

Semifinal

3rd place

Final

Final standing

Individual awards

Most Valuable Player
 Victor Poletaev
Best Spiker
 Bartosz Bućko
Best Scorer
 Bartosz Bućko
Best Blocker
 Ilia Vlasov
Best Server
 Pavel Pankov
Best Setter
 Sander Depovere
Best Receiver
 Rafał Szymura
Best Libero
 Kacper Piechocki

References

External links
Official website

Boys' Youth European Volleyball Championship
International volleyball competitions hosted by Bosnia and Herzegovina
International volleyball competitions hosted by Serbia
2013 in Bosnia and Herzegovina sport
2013 in Serbian sport
April 2013 sports events in Europe
2010s in Belgrade
International sports competitions in Belgrade
2013 in volleyball